JSC Vostochnaya Verf (until 1994 - Vladivostok Shipyard) is a Russian shipbuilding enterprise located in Vladivostok.

Background 
The enterprise was founded in 1952 for the construction of low-tonnage ships from non-magnetic materials for the needs of the Pacific Fleet and the border forces of the Far Eastern region of the USSR, such as minesweepers. In 1994, the plant was transformed into a joint stock company. From the 1950s to the 2000s, the enterprise built more than 400 ships for the Navy, border forces and fishing organizations. More than 30 units of military equipment were supplied for export to eight countries of the world (Vietnam, Cuba, China, Indonesia, Ethiopia, Guinea, Iraq, Yemen): torpedo and missile boats were built at this shipyard.

According to Igor Miroshnichenko, General Director of OJSC Vostochnaya Verf, by 2010, Vostochnaya Verf in terms of production volume reached 80-85% of the production level before restructuring.

PSKR Project 22460 patrol boats were ordered on 9 September 2014.

By the end of 2013, the full computerization of the enterprise was completed. The enterprise's capacities allow building ships and ships with a displacement of up to 2.5 thousand tons.

In 2015, Oleg Sidenko was appointed Acting Director General of Vostochnaya Verf.

Construction of the Project 03182 Mikhail Barskov small sea tanker was laid down on 27 October 2015, developed at Zelenodolsk Design Bureau as a multipurpose vessel of reinforced ice class for transporting liquid and dry cargo, performing rescue operations with the ability to receive helicopters, including unmanned aerial vehicles, continues. building No. 9001.

As of January 2016, at Vostochnaya Verf for the Federal Border Service of the FSB of Russia, PSKR Project 22460 Dozornyy was being built.

On 6 February 2018, a small sea tanker of Project 03182, serial number 9002, was laid down on the slipway.

On October 13, 2022, Vostochnaya Verf filed an application with the Primorsky Krai Arbitration Court with a request to declare it bankrupt. According to the results of 2021, the company received a large loss and cannot pay for its obligations.

Naval ships 
Naval ships built by Vostochnaya Verf include:

 Project 206-ME minehunters
 Project 10410 patrol boats
 Project 12200 patrol boats
 Project 22460 patrol boats
 Project 1496M patrol boats
 Project 11770 landing crafts
 Project 21820 landing crafts
 Project 205P missile boats
Project 12341 corvettes
 Project 12412 corvettes
 Project 21980 anti-saboteur ships
 Project V19910 hydrographic survey vessels
 Project 03182 tankers
 Project CD342 catamaran vessels

References

External links 
  

Manufacturing companies established in 1952
Military vehicle manufacturers
United Shipbuilding Corporation
Defence companies of Russia
Russian brands
1952 establishments in Russia